Thomas McIntyre Cooley (January 6, 1824 – September 12, 1898) was the 25th Justice and a Chief Justice of the Michigan Supreme Court, between 1864 and 1885. Born in Attica, New York, he was father to Charles Cooley, a distinguished American sociologist. He was a charter member and first chairman of the Interstate Commerce Commission (1887).

Cooley was appointed Dean of the University of Michigan Law School, a position he held until 1883.

Thomas M. Cooley Law School of Lansing, Michigan, founded 1972 and now affiliated with the Western Michigan University since 2014, was named after Justice Cooley to recognize his extensive contribution to American jurisprudence. Also, Cooley High School in Detroit and Cooley Elementary School in Waterford, Michigan are commemoratively named in Justice Cooley's honor.

Justice Cooley is recognized by the State Bar of Michigan as a "Michigan Legal Milestone".

Early life and career
In 1824, Thomas Cooley was born in Attica, New York, to farmers Thomas Cooley and Rachel Hubbard. He attended Attica Academy and took an interest in the law and literary pursuits. In 1842, he studied law under Theron Strong, who had just completed a term as a U.S. Representative for New York to the House of Representatives of the United States Congress. The next year, he moved to Adrian, Michigan and continued to study law. By 1846, he was admitted to the Michigan bar and married Mary Horton.

In addition to his small legal practice, Cooley was active in other intellectual and political pursuits. He wrote poems criticizing slavery and celebrating the European revolutions of 1848, edited pro-Democratic newspapers, and founded the Michigan branch of the Free Soil Party in 1848.  By 1856, he became a Republican. In the 1850s, he slowly built his professional reputation. He was compiler of Michigan statutes and a reporter for the Michigan Supreme Court. In 1859 he moved to Ann Arbor, Michigan and became one of the University of Michigan Law School's first professors.  He would go on to play a major role in the development of the university and the Law School, serving on faculty until 1884, including a long stint as the law school's dean from 1871 until 1883.

in 1864, Cooley was elected to the Supreme Court of Michigan, and served as the chief justice for 20 years. Politically, he remained a Republican, and even considered running for Congress in 1872. However, he maintained a certain independence politically, and bolted from the Republican party as a mugwump to support Grover Cleveland in 1884, and later in 1894. This independence may have cost him an appointment to the US Supreme Court. However, he was rewarded politically when in 1887 when President Cleveland nominated him to the Interstate Commerce Commission, one of the first independent agencies of the federal government.

With Mary Horton he had six children, including Charles Cooley, a distinguished American sociologist, and Thomas Benton Cooley, a noted pediatrician.

Academic works and treatises

Many of the original tomes memorializing and comprising Cooley's scholarly works are preserved and on display in the Thomas M. Cooley Law School Strosacker Law Library.

A Treatise on the Law of Torts or the Wrongs Which Arise Independently of Contract
In 1878, Cooley completed and published his work A Treatise on the Law of Torts or the Wrongs Which Arise Independently of Contract. One edition of Cooley's treatise on the subject matter of tort law was published in Chicago by Callaghan and Company in 1907. A Students' Edition was edited by John Lewis, a legal scholar and contemporary of Cooley. Lewis also wrote A Treatise on the Law of Eminent Domain. As a collegial work, Cooley's treatise on torts made extensive use of citations to case law.

The General Principles of Constitutional Law in the United States of America
Completed in March, 1880, while Dean of the University of Michigan, Cooley had published his treatise The General Principles of Constitutional Law in the United States of America. One edition of Cooley's treatise on the subject matter of Constitutional law was published in Boston by Little, Brown and Company in 1891. A Second Edition of the work was completed by a legal scholar and contemporary of Cooley's, Alexis C. Angell, in August, 1891. A third edition was published in Boston by Little, Brown and Company in 1898.

Constitutional Limitations

In 1868 Cooley published A Treatise on the Constitutional Limitations Which Rest Upon the Legislative Power of the States of the American Union, in which he analysed the creation of state constitutions and the enactment of laws. It was probably the best-known legal treatise of its time. By 1890, the sixth edition was printed.

Collegial citation of Thomas M. Cooley's theories of law

Full Faith and Credit Clause of the United States Constitution
Renowned Constitutional law scholar Edward S. Corwin wrote of the extranational judicial recognition (and, of course, that under the United States) of the implementation of, or concurrence with, Article IV, within which is the Full Faith and Credit Clause of the United States Constitution: "[i]n accordance with what is variously known as Conflict of Laws, Comity, or Private International Law, rights acquired under the laws or through the courts of one country may often receive recognition...in the courts of another country, and it is the purpose of [U.S. Const., Art. IV, Sec. 1] to guarantee that this shall be the case among the States in certain instances." Corwin, or the editors of the 1978 Princeton University Press edition of The Constitution and What it Means Today thereinafter cited the Third Edition of Cooley's Principles of Constitutional Law.

Establishment Clause of Amendment I of the United States Constitution
Corwin wrote, as to the Establishment Clause of the First Amendment of the United States Constitution (a clause contained within Amendment I), "[i]t [that Justice Story believed the United States Congress was still free to prefer the Christian religion over other religions, in contrast to modern Constitutional law and interpretation] is also supported by Cooley in his Principles of Constitutional Law, where it is said that the clause forbids 'the setting up of recognition of a state church of special favors and advantages which are denied to others.'"

Development of constitutional law jurisprudence as to due process of law
"This assumption," Robert G. McCloskey wrote as to the legal essentiality of the concept due process of law in The American Supreme Court, "was a product[,] no doubt[,] of many converging factors: the multiplication of 'welfare state' threats, the Macedonian cries of the business community and its legal and academic defenders, a growing awareness that an interpretation of due process[,] which seemed impossibly novel[—]and probably unnecessary a decade before[—]could be made acceptable by slow accretion[,] and might prove very useful in the cause of righteousness. As Waite wrote, the voices of two great contemporaries[,] Thomas M. Cooley and Stephen J. Field, must have been echoing in his mind. Cooley′s classic treatise[,] Constitutional Limitations, first published in 1868, had become a canonical text for jurists, and [Cooley's] support of due process in its emerging form gave the stamp of scholarly approval to an interpretation that seemed ethically more and more imperative."

Amendment I of the United States Constitution and freedom of the press in the United States
Corwin, or the editors of the 1978 Princeton University Press edition of The Constitution and What it Means Today, also cited Cooley in Constitutional Limitations. As to Amendment I, as to Freedom of the Press in the United States, Corwin writes: [i]n about half of the State constitutions, our State courts ... [in reference to prevailing attitudes prior to the [American] Civil War, gradually wrote into the common law of the States the principle of "qualified privilege," which is a notification to plaintiffs in libel [law]suits that if they are unlucky enough to be office holders or office seekers, they must be prepared to shoulder the almost impossible burden of showing defendant's "special malice". Students of Constitutional law and Tort law will note this additional aspect of modern libel law as applied to legal issues intersecting the comments and comportment of public figures.

Cooley and The General Principles of Constitutional Law in the United States of America on municipal corporations
Within his treatise The General Principles of Constitutional Law in the United States of America, on the subject of municipal corporations, Cooley wrote:

Works edited
Sir William Blackstone Commentaries on the laws of England: in four books, Volume 1, Callaghan and Company, Chicago, 1872, Volume 2, Callaghan and Company, Chicago, 1884.
Story, Joseph, Commentaries on the Constitution of the United States Volume 1, Fourth Edition, Boston: Little, Brown, and Co., 1873 Volume 2
Cooley, Thomas M. (1878) A Treatise on the Constitutional Limitations Which Rest Upon the Legislative Power of the States of the American Union, 4th Ed. Boston: Little Brown & Co.
Story, Joseph (Mar 26, 2008) Commentaries on the Constitution of the United States: With a Preliminary Review of the Constitutional History of the Colonies and States Before the Adoption of the Constitution 4th Edition (2 volumes) (March 26, 2008) with Notes and Commentaries by Cooley, Thomas M. (Clark, New Jersey: The Lawbook Exchange) ; .
Sir William Blackstone ; Thomas McIntyre Cooley, (1872) Commentaries on the laws of England: in four books (2nd Ed., revised & expanded) (Chicago: Callaghan & Co.)

Cooley Doctrine
<ref>This doctrine should not be confused with the now-abrogated "Cooley Doctrine" arising from Cooley v. Board of Wardens of the Port of Philadelphia, 53 U.S. 299 (1851).</ref>
In a contrasting legal theorem to that of Dillon's Rule (which posits that towns and cities have no independent authority except as explicitly or implicitly granted by a state legislature) the Cooley Doctrine proposed a legal theory of an inherent but constitutionally-permitted right to local self-determination. In a concurring opinion, Cooley, J., wrote "local government is [a] matter of absolute right; and the state cannot [as to the case referenced in the main opinion, People v. Hurlbut''] take it away."

Case law featuring opinions prominently written by Justice Cooley
The People ex rel the Detroit and Howell R.R. Co. v. the Township Board of Salem

See also

List of Johns Hopkins University people

Notes and references

Sources
Michigan Supreme Court Historical Society: Thomas McIntyre Cooley
University of Michigan Law School: History and Traditions: Thomas M. Cooley
Carrington, Paul D. "The Constitutional Law Scholarship of Thomas McIntyre Cooley" 41 Am. J. Legal Hist. 368 (1997).
Jones, Alan. "Thomas M. Cooley and the Michigan Supreme Court: 1865–1885", 10 Am. J. Legal Hist. 97 (1966).
Knowlton, Jerome C. "Thomas McInture Cooley", 5 Mich. L. Rev. 309 (1906–1907).

1824 births
1898 deaths
American legal scholars
Chief Justices of the Michigan Supreme Court
Deans of law schools in the United States
Legal history of Michigan
People from Attica, New York
People of the Interstate Commerce Commission
American scholars of constitutional law
Deans of University of Michigan Law School
University of Michigan Law School faculty
19th-century American judges
Justices of the Michigan Supreme Court
Presidents of the American Bar Association